Vitača was Queen consort of Bosnia as the first wife of King Stephen Ostoja of Bosnia.

Vitača married Ostoja, the illegitimate son of King Tvrtko I of Bosnia, before his accession to the throne of Bosnia. Ostoja was a member of the Bosnian Church and Vitača was most likely a member of that church as well. It is unknown whether they had any children.

Vitača became queen when her husband was elected to succeed Jelena Gruba in 1399. Vitača, however, was not related to the powerful nobility of Bosnia. Ostoja was forced to leave her, which was not hard to do because the Bosnian Church allowed divorce. The Ragusans referred to her as the repudiated wife of the King of Bosnia in September 1399; they kept correspondence with the ex-queen Vitača for some time after her divorce.

Ostoja married Kujava Radinović and divorced her sixteen years later.

References 
 John Van Antwerp Fine, Bosnian Institute; The Bosnian Church: Its Place in State and Society from the Thirteenth to the Fifteenth Century, Saqi in association with The Bosnian Institute, 2007

|-

Bosnian queens
14th-century births
15th-century deaths
Repudiated queens
Kotromanić dynasty